The Valencia hispanica  or Valencia toothcarp is a species of freshwater fish in the family Valenciidae endemic to the south of Catalonia and the Valencian Community, Spain. There is at least one historical record of this species from near Perpignan in France but the species has been extirpated from that country.

Its natural habitat are marshes, freshwater springs, coastal freshwater lagoons and acequias which may connect these. It is threatened by pollution and habitat loss.

Description

It is a small fish of a light brown to yellow colour. Adult males oscillate between 4–8 cm and can be distinguished from females in that the rim of their fins is orangish. Also, females are slightly larger than their male counterparts of the same age.

It is a gregarious fish forming small shoals. The species is carnivorous, feeding on insects, larvae, worms, etc.

Conservation status

Valencia toothcarp is listed as an endangered species by Spanish and international legislation. Its populations dwindled as a result of land reclamation, a phenomenon quite intense in Valencia during the 1980s as a part of the touristic boom. The increased human population which followed also brought increased pollution and introduced species, both factors further damaging the samaruc populations.

It has been recently object of a conservation and reintroduction program carried out by the Environment department of the Valencian regional government which has sought to reverse further declines.

See also
 Valencia letourneuxi
Fartet

References

External links

Endemic fish of the Iberian Peninsula
Endemic fauna of Spain
Fish described in 1846
Taxonomy articles created by Polbot
Valencia tooth carp